Jabab  is a Syrian village located in Al-Sanamayn District, Daraa. According to the Syria Central Bureau of Statistics (CBS), Jabab had a population of 7,699 in the 2004 census.

History
In 1838, it  was noted as a Sunni Muslim village,  situated "the Nukra, north of Al-Shaykh Maskin".

References

Bibliography

External links
 Mesmiye-map; 19M

Populated places in Al-Sanamayn District